Fritz Köpke (21 January 1902 – 18 November 1991) was a German athlete. He competed in the men's high jump at the 1928 Summer Olympics.

References

External links
 

1902 births
1991 deaths
Athletes (track and field) at the 1928 Summer Olympics
German male high jumpers
Olympic athletes of Germany
People from Gryfice County
Sportspeople from West Pomeranian Voivodeship